is a Japanese voice actress, singer, and manga artist who made her debut as a voice actress in 2009 as Himemiya in Weiß Survive R.

She is a member of the singer group Milky Holmes, formed by the four main voice actresses in the media franchise Tantei Opera Milky Holmes. Similarly, as Nico Yazawa, she is a member of the singer group formed by the nine main voice actresses in the media franchise Love Live! and has released singles under the fictional group name μ's. She is also part of a mini unit within the Love Live! the project called BiBi, alongside Yoshino Nanjō and Pile.

Tokui is also a manga artist whose work, including the 4koma Mahou Shoujo Jitaku-chan, has been serialized in Otapoke magazine. Her manga Makeruna!! Aku no Gundan! has been made into an anime series. She describes herself as an otaku, and has mentioned in particular her love for Neon Genesis Evangelion and the character Asuka Langley Soryu, whom she cosplayed at a screening of Q Evangelion.

In late March 2020, Sora made her YouTuber debut with the message in the English translation' "I am interested in many things, so I want to challenge everything!"

As of late 2020, she uploaded her official Virtual YouTuber avatar.

Filmography

Anime television
Weiß Survive R (2009), Himemiya
Tantei Opera Milky Holmes (2010), Nero Yuzurizaki
Tantei Opera Milky Holmes: Act 2 (2012), Nero Yuzurizaki
Chitose Get You!! (2012), Misaki
Little Busters! (2012), Sasami Sasasegawa
Robotics;Notes (2012), Junna Daitoku
Love Live! (2013), Nico Yazawa
Gargantia on the Verdurous Planet (2013), Mayta
Fantasista Doll (2013), Katia
Futari wa Milky Holmes (2013), Nero Yuzurizaki
Day Break Illusion (2013), Luna Tsukuyomi
Wanna Be the Strongest in the World (2013), Hornet
Neppu Kairiku Bushi Road (2013), Yuzu Jijo
Future Card Buddyfight (2014), Paruko Nanana
Is the Order a Rabbit? (2014), Maya Jōga
Chō-Bakuretsu I-Jigen Menko Battle Gigant Shooter Tsukasa (2014), Miruko Koide
Love Live! Season 2 (2014), Nico Yazawa
Unlimited Fafnir (2015), Ariella Lu
Tantei Kageki Milky Holmes TD (2015), Nero Yuzurizaki
Rin-ne (2015), Miho
Danchigai (2015), Uzuki Nakano
Is the Order a Rabbit?? (2015), Maya Jōga
JK Meshi! (2015), Ruriko Igarashi
Future Card Buddyfight 100 (2015), Paruko Nanana
PriPara (2015), Brittany
Luck & Logic (2016), Chloe Maxwell
Bishoujo Yuugi Unit Crane Game Girls (2016), Asuka
Future Card Buddyfight Triple D (2016), Paruko Nanana 
This Art Club Has a Problem! (2016), Kaori Ayase
Nazotokine (2016),  Hacchin
BanG Dream! (2017), Hinako Nijukki
Blend S (2017), Hideri Kanzaki
Two Car (2017), Ai Maita
Dances with the Dragons (2018), Berdrit Livy Raki
Pop Team Epic Episode 10 (2018), Popuko
High School DxD Hero (2018), Kunou
Alice or Alice (2018), Kisaki
Over Drive Girl 1/6 (2019), Kusabi
Kiratto Pri Chan (2019), Suzu Kurokawa
Demon Lord, Retry! (2019), Yukikaze
Didn't I Say to Make My Abilities Average in the Next Life?! (2019), Reina
Assassins Pride (2019), Black Madea
Rebirth (2020), Kanna
Seton Academy: Join the Pack! (2020), Kurumi Nekomai
Tsugu Tsugumomo (2020), Kyouka
Princess Connect! Re:Dive (2020), Rima
Jujutsu Kaisen (2020), Akari Nitta
Tropical-Rouge! Pretty Cure (2021), Saki Sakuragawa, Mifuyu Harada
Banished from the Hero's Party (2021), Nao
PuraOre! Pride of Orange (2021), Ema Yoshiike
Yatogame-chan Kansatsu Nikki 4 Satsume (2022), Kei Aonaji
My One-Hit Kill Sister (2023), Gloria
The Aristocrat's Otherworldly Adventure: Serving Gods Who Go Too Far (2023), Tifana
Helck (2023), Rococo
Liar Liar (2023), Suzuran Kazami

Movies
 Love Live! The School Idol Movie (2015), Nico Yazawa

OVA
Tantei Opera Milky Holmes Summer Special, Nero Yuzurizaki
Tantei Opera Milky Holmes Alternative ONE -Kobayashi Opera to 5-mai no Kaiga-, Nero Yuzurizaki
Tantei Opera Milky Holmes Alternative TWO -Kobayashi Opera to Kokū no Ōgarasu-, Nero Yuzurizaki

Video games
2013
The Guided Fate Paradox, Liliel (Credited as "Nico Yazawa")
Love Live! School Idol Festival (Android/iOS), Nico Yazawa
Hyperdevotion Noire: Goddess Black Heart, Moruu
2015
MeiQ: Labyrinth of Death, Connie
Senran Kagura: Estival Versus, Hanabi
2016
Girls' Frontline, Glock 17, F2000
Senran Kagura: Peach Beach Splash, Hanabi
2017
Danganronpa V3: Killing Harmony, Tenko Chabashira¨
Blue Reflection, Kei Narimiya¨
Miniature Garden, Shibaya Sumika
Shinobi Master Senran Kagura: New Link, Hanabi
2018
Princess Connect! Re:Dive, Rima
2019
Arknights, Swire
Love Live! School Idol Festival All Stars (Android/iOS), Nico Yazawa
2020
Magia Record: Puella Magi Madoka Magica Side Story, Tsumugi Wakana
Guardian Tales (Android/iOS), Red Hood Elvira
2021
 Blue Archive (Android/iOS), Momoi Saiba
Counter:Side (Android/iOS/PC), Himeno Yui(Shin Jia)
Figure Fantasy (Android/iOS), Suzumi

Dubbing

Live-action 
Pretty Little Liars: Original Sin - Imogen Adams (Bailee Madison)

Animation 
The Powerpuff Girls - Blossom
My Little Pony: Friendship Is Magic - Applejack

Discography

Sora Tokui

Solo Singles
 "Koiiro Comics", released February 2 2016

Love Live! School Idol Project

Singles
 "Snow Halation", released December 22, 2010
 "Natsuiro Egao de 1, 2, Jump!", released August 24, 2011
 "Mahoutsukai Hajimemashita!", released May 23, 2012
 "Kaguya no Shiro de Odoritai", released February 6, 2013
 "Cutie Panther", released July 24, 2013
 "Takaramonozu", released January 29, 2014
 "Colorful Voice", released May 8, 2014
 "Trouble Busters", released December 24, 2014
 "Psychic Fire", released January 20, 2016

References

External links
 

1989 births
Living people
People from Minamibōsō
Voice actresses from Chiba Prefecture
Japanese video game actresses
Japanese voice actresses
Manga artists
21st-century Japanese women singers
21st-century Japanese singers
21st-century Japanese actresses
Anime singers
Μ's members
Milky Holmes members
Japanese YouTubers
VTubers